Haftshuiyeh (also Romanized as Haftshū’īyeh, Haft Shū’īyeh, Haftshūyeh, and Haft Shūyeh) is a village in Qahab-e Shomali Rural District, in the Central District of Isfahan County, Isfahan Province, Iran. At the 2006 census, its population was 1,248, in 332 families.

References 

Populated places in Isfahan County